is a junction passenger railway station located in the city of Kasukabe, Saitama, Japan, operated by the private railway operator Tōbu Railway.

Lines
Kasukabe Station is served by the following lines.

Station Layout
This station consists of two island platforms and one side platform serving a total of seven tracks (two of which are not in normal use). The platforms are connected to the station building by a footbridge.

Platforms

Adjacent stations

History
The kanji of the station name was changed to its present form on 1 September 1949.

From 17 March 2012, station numbering was introduced on all Tōbu lines, with Kasukabe Station becoming "TS-27" on the Tobu Skytree Line and "TD-10" on the Urban Park Line.

Passenger statistics
In fiscal 2019, the station was used by an average of 71,071 passengers daily.

Surrounding area
Kasukabe City Hall
Kasukage Post Office
Kasukabe City Hospital

See also
 List of railway stations in Japan

References

External links

 Tobu station information 

Railway stations in Japan opened in 1899
Tobu Skytree Line
Tobu Noda Line
Stations of Tobu Railway
Railway stations in Saitama Prefecture
Kasukabe, Saitama